David Hogue (born 1962) is an American politician. He is a member of the North Dakota State Senate from the 38th District, serving since 2009. He is a member of the Republican party.

References

|-

1962 births
21st-century American politicians
Cornell College alumni
Living people
National Guard (United States) officers
Politicians from Bismarck, North Dakota
Presidents pro tempore of the North Dakota Senate
Republican Party North Dakota state senators
University of North Dakota alumni